David Wilson (born 4 October 1944 in Wednesfield) is an English former professional footballer who played as a striker.

References

1944 births
Living people
People from Wednesfield
English footballers
Association football forwards
Nottingham Forest F.C. players
Carlisle United F.C. players
Grimsby Town F.C. players
Walsall F.C. players
Burnley F.C. players
Chesterfield F.C. players
English Football League players